Thakurgaon may refer to:

Bangladesh

  Thakurgaon District
 Thakurgaon Stadium
 Thakurgaon Sadar Upazila
 Thakurgaon STOLport airport
 Thakurgaon-3, a parliamentary constituency

India
 Thakurgaon, Bhiwandi, a village
 Ginjo Thakurgaon, a village

exit